The minor spliceosome is a ribonucleoprotein complex that catalyses the removal (splicing) of an atypical class of spliceosomal introns (U12-type) from messenger RNAs in some clades of eukaryotes. This process is called noncanonical splicing, as opposed to U2-dependent canonical splicing. U12-type introns represent less than 1% of all introns in human cells. However they are found in genes performing essential cellular functions.

Early evidence

A notable feature of eukaryotic nuclear pre-mRNA introns is the relatively high level of conservation of the primary sequences of 5' and 3' splice sites over a great range of organisms.

Between 1989 and 1991, several groups reported four independent examples of introns with a splice site that differed from the common intron:

Cartilage matrix protein (CMP/MATN1) gene in humans and chickens
Proliferating cell nucleolar protein P120 (NOL1) gene in humans
Mouse Rep3 gene, presumably involved in DNA repair
Drosophila prospero gene that encodes for a homeobox protein

In 1991 by comparing the intron sequences of P120 and CMP genes, IJ Jackson reported the existence of ATATCC (5') and YYCAC (3') splice sites in these introns. The finding indicated a possible novel splicing mechanism. 
 
In 1994, S.L. Hall and R.A. Padgett compared the primary sequence of all reports on the four genes mentioned above. The results suggested a new type of introns with ATATCCTT 5' splice sites and YCCAC 3' splice sites and an almost invariant TCCTTAAC sequence near the 3' end of the introns (so called 3' upstream element). A search for small nuclear RNA sequences that are complementary to these splice sites suggested U12 snRNA (matches the 3' sequence) and U11 snRNA (matches the 5' sequence) as being putative factors involved in splicing of this new type of introns.   
  
In all these four genes, the pre-mRNA contains other introns whose sequences conform to those of major class introns. Neither the size nor the position of the AT–AC intron within the host gene is conserved.

In 1996, Woan-Yuh Tarn and Joan A. Steitz described an in vitro system that splices a pre-mRNA substrate containing an AT–AC intron derived from the human P120 gene. Psoralen cross-linking confirms the base-pairing interaction predicted by Hall and Padgett between the branch site of the pre-mRNA substrate and U12 RNA. Native gel electrophoresis reveals that U11, U12, and U5 snRNPs assemble onto the P120 pre-mRNA to form splicing complexes.

Structure of U12-type introns 
Although originally referred to as AT-AC introns, not all these introns are delimited by AT-AC dinucleotides. Some of them have GT-AG or AT-AG ends, at least. Thus, it is more correct to speak about the splicing machinery which is used to process them, differentiating between U2-type (canonical or major) and U12-type (non-canonical or minor). The main determinants for distinguishing U2- and U12-type introns are 5' splice site and branch site sequences.

The minor spliceosome consists of U11, U12, U4atac, and U6atac, together with U5 and an unknown number of non-snRNP proteins. The U11, U12 and U4atac/U6atac snRNPs are functional analogs of the U1, U2 and U4/U6 snRNPs in the major spliceosome. Although the minor U4atac and U6atac snRNAs are functional analogs of U4 and U6, respectively, they share only limited sequence homology (c. 40%). Furthermore, the sequence of U11 in comparison with U1, as well as U12 compared with U2, are completely unrelated. Despite this fact, the minor U11, U12, U4atac and U6atac snRNAs can be folded into structures similar to U1, U2, U4 and U6, respectively.

Location of minor spliceosomal activity

The location of spliceosomal activity for the minor class spliceosome is regarded by most experts to be in the nucleus.  However, a single paper has claimed that the minor spliceosome is active in the cytosol.  The data presented within this paper are not fully accepted within the field and directly contradict numerous other papers.

Evolution

Like the major spliceosome, the minor spliceosome had an early origin: several of its characteristic constituents are present in representative organisms from all eukaryotic supergroups for which there is any substantial genome sequence information. In addition, functionally important sequence elements contained within U12-type introns and snRNAs are highly conserved during evolution.

See also 
RNA splicing
Spliceosome

References
Review papers:
  Review.
  Review.

Classic papers:

 
 

Other references:

Organelles
Gene expression
RNA
Spliceosome
RNA splicing